NCOC may refer to:
National Conference on Citizenship
New College of California
North Caspian Operating Company